Balaskaleh-ye Emam Jomeh (also Romanized as Balaskaleh-ye Emām Jom‘eh; also known as Balaskaleh-ye Emām Jom‘eh-ye Bozorg) is a village in Hajji Bekandeh-ye Koshk-e Bijar Rural District, Khoshk-e Bijar District, Rasht County, Gilan Province, Iran. At the 2006 census, its population was 311, in 94 families.

References 

Populated places in Rasht County